Carboxylic acids are organic acids characterized by a carboxyl (-COOH) functional group. The naming of these compounds is governed by IUPAC nomenclature, which ensures systematic and consistent naming of chemicals. Numerous organic compounds have other common names, often originating in historical source material thereof. The systematic IUPAC name is not always the preferred IUPAC name, for example, lactic acid is a common, and also the preferred, name for what systematic rules call 2-hydroxypropanoic acid.

This list is ordered by the number of carbon atoms in a carboxylic acid.

C1

C2

C3

C4

C5

C6

C7

C8

2-6 dimethyl octen dioic acid

C9

C10

C11

C12

C13

C14

C15

C16

C17

C18

C19

C20

C21

C22

C23

C24

C25

C26

Carboxylic acids
Carboxylic acids